Rugby union in Ireland is a very popular team sport. Rugby union is organised on an all-Ireland basis with one national team, governing body and league for both the Republic of Ireland and Northern Ireland. Founded in 1879, the Irish Rugby Football Union is the third-oldest rugby union after England and Scotland, and was formed two years prior to the Welsh Rugby Union.

Governing body

The Irish Rugby Football Union (IRFU) is the governing body for rugby union in Ireland. The IRFU is divided into five branches. The four main branches represent the four provinces of Ireland: Ulster, Munster, Leinster and Connacht. Each provincial branch organises the sport within its geographic area. All four field senior teams that compete in the Pro14 (originally the Celtic League and later Pro12), and also field "A" teams and have player development academies. The fifth branch is the Exiles Branch, tasked with identifying and developing players living in England, Scotland and Wales who are qualified to represent Ireland through their ancestry.

Initially, there were two unions both founded in 1874 - the Irish Football Union had jurisdiction over clubs in Leinster, Munster and parts of Ulster; the Northern Football Union of Ireland controlled the Belfast area. The IRFU was formed in 1879 as an amalgamation of these two organisations and branches of the new IRFU were formed in Leinster, Munster and Ulster. The Connacht Branch was formed in 1886.

The IRFU was a founding member of the International Rugby Football Board, now known as World Rugby, in 1886 with Scotland and Wales. (England refused to join until 1890.)

History

Prehistory
Ireland had a strong tradition of folk football games long before the various forms of modern football such as rugby, association football, and Gaelic football were codified. The local varieties were often quite different from one another, and some bore more resemblance to certain modern codes than others:

"Other texts suggest that Co.s Meath, Louth and north Dublin were football strongholds during the 16th and 17th centuries. The poem Iomáin Léana an Bhábhdhúin by Réamann Ó Murchada describes an eight-a-side football game in Omeath in 1750, which lasted from midday to sunset.

"Different versions of football were played in various parts of the country. Games were played between parishes or between Baronies and would sometimes last for hours. However there was no organised form of the game, and little interaction between the various regions. The rules also varied according to region, some games being more disciplined than others. The number of players varied from place to place, though the basic principle of moving the ball from one end of the field to the other remained the same."

Occasionally the ball in these games would resemble a rugby ball:

"The ball was generally round, but that depended on the materials used, sometimes it was oval, but by accident, rather than design."

According to Jack Mahon, even in the Irish countryside, the traditional sport of caid had begun to give way to a "rough-and-tumble game" which even allowed tripping.

Late 19th century
During the 1860s, 1870s and 1880s, rugby, along with association football, started to become popular in Ireland. Trinity College, Dublin was an early stronghold of rugby.
The Dublin Hospitals Rugby Cup was started in 1881, it is the oldest rugby competition in Ireland. Although the Ulster Schools' Challenge Cup is an annual competition involving schools affiliated to the Ulster Branch of the Irish Rugby Football Union. The Schools' Cup has the distinction of being the world's second-oldest rugby competition, having been competed for every year since 1876, although the final wasn't played in 1911 and 2021 (Covid).

Rugby and the GAA

During the late 19th century, in response to the perceived encroachment of English sports, including rugby, Irish nationalist Michael Cusack set up the Gaelic Athletic Association (GAA). There was a rule, Rule 42 of the GAA's Official Guide which prohibited the playing of non-Gaelic games in GAA stadiums, including rugby until it was lifted in 2007. However, the rule was relaxed while Lansdowne Road was being redeveloped, and rugby was played in Croke Park including a match between Leinster and Munster that broke the club rugby attendance record; see List of non-Gaelic games played in Croke Park for exceptions to this rule.

The first game to take place under the relaxed Rule 42 took place on 11 February 2007.  It was a Six Nations Championship rugby match between Ireland and France which Ireland lost 17–20. The following match against England generated some controversy, since it involved the playing of God Save the Queen at a ground where British soldiers had killed fourteen spectators on Bloody Sunday, 1920. There was a small protest by Republican Sinn Féin outside the ground which included a man holding a sign saying No to foreign games while ironically wearing a Celtic FC tracksuit.

Irish Rugby have officially announced their bid to host the 2023 Rugby World Cup on 15 November 2016. This will include 8 venues that are owned by the GAA. They are Croke Park (Dublin), Fitzgerald Stadium (Kerry), Páirc Uí Chaoimh (Cork), Pearse Stadium (Galway), Casement Park (Belfast), Elverys MacHale Park (Mayo), Nowlan Park (Kilkenny) and Celtic Park (Derry).

20th century

Although rugby has traditionally been associated with the more anglophile elements of Irish society, it has not been without its following in the nationalist and republican communities. For example, the longest serving taoiseach, Éamon de Valera was a former player, and lifetime fan of the game. At the age of sixteen, De Valera won a scholarship to Blackrock College, County Dublin. It was at Blackrock College that de Valera began playing rugby. Later during his tenure at Rockwell College, he joined the school's rugby team where he played fullback on the first team, which reached the final of the Munster Senior Cup. De Valera was a close friend of the Ryan brothers at Rockwell who played on Ireland's Triple Crown-winning team in 1899. De Valera remained a lifelong devotee of rugby, attending numerous international matches up to and towards the end of his life despite near blindness.

Other notable politicians, from very different backgrounds, who have played rugby for Ireland include Tyrone Howe (a former Unionist Party councillor), Trevor Ringland (a Unionist Parliamentary candidate) and Dick Spring (former Tánaiste and Labour Party TD).

Present day

Nowadays, rugby is played by both nationalists and unionists. Historically, it tended to be popular with different social groups in different parts of Ireland, although generally speaking it is regarded as a middle-class sport in Ireland and further afield. In Limerick city, it is enjoyed across the social spectrum, while in Leinster and Cork City it remains very much a middle-class game. Rugby traditionally isn't as prevalent in Connacht, although it is less defined there by social class.  In Northern Ireland it is traditionally played in mainly-middle-class Protestant grammar schools. The changing climate in Northern Ireland politics has altered this perceived tradition with the introduction of rugby into an increasing number of Roman Catholic grammar and secondary schools which were previously exclusively associated with Gaelic games.

The conversion of rugby from amateurism to professionalism led to the Irish Rugby Football Union (IRFU) using the provincial structure to create four professional teams, with the Irish players on these teams on central contracts to the IRFU, meaning that they, and not the provinces, control when the players play and when they rest. Professionalism has, on the whole, been very good for the top level of Irish rugby. The national team has won several triple crowns and three Grand Slam (rugby union) and is able to play at a competitive level with the world's rugby giants, having beaten all including New Zealand in the last five years.

Ireland's provinces have also been successful in the professional era. Ulster won the European Cup in 1999, and in the years immediately surrounding 2010 Munster, Ulster and Leinster regularly featured in the latter stages of the competition, culminating in Munster's wins in 2006 and 2008 and Leinster's in 2009, 2011 and 2012 (also, Leinster defeated Ulster in the 2012 final). In addition, Leinster won the European Challenge Cup in 2013 after having parachuted in from that season's Heineken Cup. In the league now known as Pro14, the provinces are either regular winners or near the top of the league. In 2006, the big three Irish provinces finished in the top three places of the league, Ulster claiming the title with a dramatic last second drop goal ensuring they finished above Leinster. Each of the big three has won the league at least once—Leinster won the league's inaugural title in 2002 and again in 2008, 2013, 2014 and 2018; Ulster won it for the first and only time in 2006; and Munster won in 2003, 2009 and 2011. The other province, Connacht, capped their first-ever appearance in the Pro12 play-offs in 2016 with their first title.

The level below the provinces, the clubs, has probably suffered somewhat in the professional era. Top players play almost exclusively for their provinces with only rare outings for clubs, usually as a result of returning from injury or loss of form.

The game was played in Croke Park on 2 May 2009, when Leinster defeated Munster 25–6. The attendance of 82,208 set a new world record attendance for a club rugby union game.

In December 2011, the IRFU announced a new policy, most of which took effect with the 2013–14 season, that restricted the signing of overseas players to professional contracts. The policy was designed to encourage development of home-grown players. Leinster, Munster and Ulster combined are limited to one player at each position who is not eligible for Ireland selection. In addition, the provinces are not allowed to renew or enter into new contracts that fail to meet these rules. Under this policy, all injury replacement players must also be Ireland-qualified, and each province is explicitly limited to five overseas players in their senior squad. Connacht is not covered by this policy; it signed a separate development agreement with the IRFU that presumably contained similar restrictions on overseas players after recent criticism of the signing of Ukrainian national Nick McCarthy.

Competitions

The Irish national team competes in the Six Nations tournament and Summer and Autumn test series which are held every year, and also the Rugby World Cup which is held every four years. The Ireland "A" (second-level) national team, from February 2010 known as Ireland Wolfhounds, have in the past competed in a smaller tournament called the Churchill Cup, although they did not play in either of that tournament's final two editions in 2010 or 2011.

Irish provinces compete in the Pro14 (originally the Celtic League before gaining sponsorship first from Magners, later Rabobank's RaboDirect subsidiary, and now Guinness) against Welsh regions, Scotland super-districts, since 2010–11 Italian franchises, and from 2017–18 South African regions. Historically, Leinster, Munster and Ulster competed in the Heineken Cup. Connacht normally competed in the European Challenge Cup, but made their Heineken Cup debut in 2011–12 by virtue of Leinster's 2011 Heineken Cup win. Similarly, the all-Irish 2012 Heineken Cup final resulted in Connacht returning to the Heineken Cup in 2012–13, and Leinster's 2013 Challenge Cup win (after parachuting in from that season's Heineken Cup) led to Connacht playing in the last Heineken Cup in 2013–14.

Starting in 2014–15, the Heineken Cup and European Challenge Cup were replaced by new professional club competitions, respectively the European Rugby Champions Cup and European Rugby Challenge Cup, although both competitions claim the histories of their predecessors. From 2017–18, the top seven European teams in Pro14 (i.e., excluding the two South African sides) qualify for the following season's Champions Cup regardless of their country. This replaced a system in which the top Irish side in the previous season's Pro12 table automatically qualified for the Champions Cup, with additional Irish sides able to qualify for that competition if they were among the three top Pro12 finishers apart from the top team of each Pro12 nation. Also from 2017–18, the Pro14 will not be involved in the play-off that had in the past provided a Pro12 side with a possible additional entry to the Champions Cup. All European Pro14 teams that do not qualify for the Champions Cup will play in the Challenge Cup.

Competitions have taken place since the late 19th century with the modern day Inter Provincial Championship between Munster, Leinster, Ulster and Connacht first contested in 1920, with the oldest interprovincial match held between Leinster and Ulster.

Another focus for the domestic game in Ireland is the All Ireland League. This was started in 1990 and has now expanded to four divisions - 1A, 1B, 2A and 2B.

Irish provincial "A" teams from Leinster, Munster and Ulster have taken part in the British and Irish Cup competition since its inception in 2009–10, with Connacht "A" joining when the competition expanded from 24 to 32 teams for 2012–13. For 2013–14, the competition reverted to 24 teams, but all four Irish provinces continue to field "A" teams in the Cup. Since 2013–14, the Cup has included four clubs from the Scottish Premiership, four from the Welsh Premier Division and all 12 clubs in England's RFU Championship.

Playing numbers

The IRFU Annual Report for 2006-2007 reported playing figures within Ireland as follows:
Adult Male Players: 21740
Women Players: 1756
Secondary Schools Players: 23586
Youth Players: 12472
Mini Rugby Players: 10967
Primary School: 32209
TOTAL PLAYERS: 100974

Stadiums and attendance
The professional era and the advent of the competitions now known as Pro14 and the European Rugby Champions Cup have seen rugby union become a major spectator sport in Ireland. European Cup games are generally well supported in all the provinces, with sellouts the norm and massive crowds in Dublin's Lansdowne Road for quarterfinal and semifinal matches. Ulster, Munster and Leinster have all won the Heineken Cup. In the past Ulster led the then-Celtic League attendances for 3 years in the row and Connacht, Munster and Leinster's crowds have grown year on year and with the later two setting new world records for province/club attendance.

Munster extensively renovated and expanded their traditional home of Thomond Park in a project that was completed in 2008. Royal Dublin Society expanded their RDS Arena in the same time period, which prompted Leinster to make it their primary home whilst they were planning to expand their own traditional ground at Donnybrook. After the Donnybrook plans fell through, Leinster chose to remain at the RDS. Connacht completed ground expansion and renovation works in time for the 2011/2012 season with the construction of the Clan Terrace. And in 2014, Ulster completed the complete reconstruction of Ravenhill Stadium into a modern 18,000 capacity stadium. Munster are currently in the process of construing a new stand at their secondary home of Musgrave Park.

Before the opening of Aviva Stadium, Ireland international games sold out against all but the weakest opposition, and with the team playing at Croke Park during the reconstruction of Lansdowne Road, attendances regularly topped 80,000. However, the Aviva saw disappointing attendance during its first Tests in 2010, with no match selling out; media reports indicated that this was largely due to an IRFU ticketing strategy that made little sense in an uncertain economy. More recent Tests have seen crowds much closer to capacity, including sellouts or near-sellouts for all of Ireland's Six Nations home fixtures.

National teams

Men's national teams

The Ireland national team are considered by World Rugby to be in the first tier.
Ireland contest the Six Nations Championship every year against Europe's traditional rugby powers.

Every four years the British and Irish Lions go on tour with players from Ireland as well as England, Scotland and Wales.

As with all top-tier rugby nations, and many lower-tier countries, Ireland also field an "A" national side, a second-level national selection primarily intended to develop younger talent for possible future duty on the senior national team. Since February 2010, the IRFU have rebranded the A side as Ireland Wolfhounds. The Wolfhounds generally play "A" teams of the other major European powers and senior sides of lower-tier nations.

The IRFU also fields the Ireland national rugby sevens team. The sevens team competes in qualifying events for major quadrennial tournaments – the Olympics and the Rugby World Cup Sevens. The sevens team also competes in qualifying for the World Rugby Sevens Series.
 
The IRFU also organizes an Ireland national under-20 rugby union team that competes against under-20 teams from other counties in Europe and globally.

Women's national team

Ireland won the 2013 Women's Six Nations Championship with a grand slam.

They defeated New Zealand 17–14 in the pool games of the 2014 Women's Rugby World Cup. They also finished in their highest ranking at the 2014 World Cup despite losing to France 18–25 in the third place play-off.
Ireland were champions in the 2015 Women's Six Nations Championship.

Ireland hosted the 2017 Women's Rugby World Cup, the first time Ireland hosted a Rugby World Cup. Ireland lost to Wales 17–27 in the eighth place play off.

See also
Sport in Ireland
Sport in the United Kingdom
Rugby union in the British Isles
Comparison of Gaelic football and rugby union

References

 Richards, Huw A Game for Hooligans: The History of Rugby Union (Mainstream Publishing, Edinburgh, 2007)
 Rugby Union, Irish Nationalism and National Identity in Northern Ireland
 IRB statistics for Ireland

External links 

Irish Rugby Football Union
Rugby news from RTE
Irish rugby union news from Planet Rugby